"Scream" is a song by American producer and rapper Timbaland, released as the fifth and final single from his second studio album Shock Value (2007). The song features vocals from American singer and songwriter Keri Hilson and the lead singer of the Pussycat Dolls at the time Nicole Scherzinger. Mosley and Hilson co-wrote the song with American producer Danja, who co-produced the song with Timbaland. Mosley Music Group, in association with Blackground Records and Interscope Records, serviced the song to mainstream radios in the United States in December 2007.

"Scream" received generally positive reviews from music critics, with a majority of them praising Hilson's vocal performance, while one reviewer deemed Timbaland's vocals as creepy. The song charted moderately, possibly due in part to the continuing success of Timbaland's previous single "Apologize". It peaked within the top ten in countries like New Zealand and Sweden and in the top fifteen tier in countries like Australia and Ireland. Despite being released first in the United States, the song did not chart on the Billboard Hot 100, being his only single in the United States from Shock Value not to do so. The accompanying music video portrays Timbaland being caressed by two other women while Hilson and Scherzinger are in separate scenes performing seductive movements in isolated areas.

Background
"Scream" was written and composed by Timbaland (as Tim Mosley), Danja (as Nate Hills) and Keri Hilson. Mosley and Hills produced the track and provided instrumentation for it with both playing the keyboard and bass while Timbaland plays on the drums. Danja is credited on the song for playing the guitars with musicians Kevin Rudolf and Dan Warner. The song was recorded and programmed by sound engineers Demacio "Demo" Castellon and Marcella "Ms. Lago" Araica at the Hit Factory Criteria in Miami while the two mixed the track at Chalice Recording Studios in Los Angeles. Castellon and Araica were assisted by James Barton in mixing the track while editing for the song was conducted by Ron Taylor using Pro Tools technology. The gospel-tinged song has been described as "funky and seductive" in sound with a sexy groove. Sean Fennessey of Vibe Magazine describes "Scream" as an "alluring", "repetitious" song "with a whirring sexuality." "Scream" is the final single released from Shock Value (2007). Mosley Music Group, in association with Blackground Records and Interscope Records, serviced the song to mainstream radios on December 11, 2007, in the United States. "Scream" was later released around the world between February and March of the following year in digital, extended play and CD single formats.

Critical reception
Nathan Rabin of The A.V. Club described the song, along with "Bombay" and "Fantasy", as an attempt to maintain modern appeal, writing that they "capture hip-hop icons desperately trying to pin down the quicksilver sound of today before it becomes yesterday's style." Ann Powers of the Los Angeles Times was dismissive of Timbaland's vocals through the album, writing that "he's ... creepy coming on to Pussycat Doll Nicole Scherzinger." Daniel Incognito of Sputnikmusic praised Keri Hilson's vocals on "Scream" and "Miscommunication", writing that "she displays an intoxicating mix of talented R&B vocals with intelligence, personality and poise." Steve "Flash" Juon of RapReviews described Hilson and Scherzinger's performances as the "dirtiest and most erotic ... of all time". Norman Mayers of Prefix Magazine labeled "Scream" and "Miscommunication", which also features Hilson, as "winners", while commenting that Hilson naturally fits in with Timbaland's songs.

Ivan Rott of About.com, however, expressed his discontent, implying that the song itself would compel one to scream. Andrea Park of The Online Gargoyle shared the same thoughts in her review of the album, stating that "The flat quality of this album was most apparent in the five songs with accompanying female vocalists." Houston Chronicle writer Zharmer Hardimon finds that Keri Hilson's vocals bests those of Nicole Scherzinger while David Hyland of WESH Orlando feels she overdoes the singing, writing that she's "operating under the mistaken impression that her weak voice is some powerful instrument that is bursting forth." A writer for Toronto Star praised "Scream" and "The Way I Are" as some of the album's most interesting tracks.

Chart performance
"Scream" was a moderate hit in many international territories. In Canada, the song first entered the Canadian Hot 100 on the issue dated January 12, 2008, at number ninety-two, during the week that Timbaland's "Apologize" held the top position. It steadily ascended the chart until the issue dated February 16, 2008, when it peaked at number forty-one. "Scream" fared better in Australia, where it peaked on the Australian Singles Chart at number twenty on the week of March 9, 2008, and was present on the chart for a total of fourteen weeks. On the issue dated January 28, 2008, the song debuted on the New Zealand Singles Chart at number thirty-two. It quickly ascended into the top twenty and, by the sixth week, had peaked at number nine. In Ireland, "Scream" debuted on the chart at number fifteen on the issue dated February 7, 2008. The song ascended in the top twenty and on the week ending March 13, 2008, it reached its peak at number ten, rising from number nineteen the week before.
In Sweden, the song debuted at number thirty-one on the week ending January 10, 2008. The following week, it moved up twenty places to number eleven and by the fourth week, the song had moved up into the top ten, peaking at number eight. It amassed a total of fifteen weeks on the chart, spending its last week at number sixty.

Music video
The music video for the song premiered on Yahoo! Music on January 15, 2008, and was directed by Justin Francis.  The video begins with Timbaland singing while being massaged and seduced by two women. It then shows cuts of Timbaland, Scherzinger and Hilson singing with and without Balaclavas under a car park. At the conclusion of the second chorus, Scherzinger is shown singing in an elevator while performing in front of a 1965 Buick Riviera and a Ford Mustang with and without a balaclava. The next scene displays Timbaland and his two friends planning a robbery with intercuts of Scherzinger, Hilson and Timbaland singing in front of a car. The video concludes with Timbaland and his two friends walking into the targeted house.

Track listings

Digital download
 "Scream" (radio edit)

CD single
 "Scream" (radio edit) – 3:44
 "Scream" (instrumental) – 5:42

iTunes EP
 "Scream" (radio edit) – 3:44
 "Scream" (acapella) – 5:33
 "Scream" (instrumental) – 5:36

Credits and personnel
Credits adapted from the liner notes of Shock Value, Mosley Music Group, in association with Blackground Records and Interscope Records.

Recording and mixing
 Recorded at Hit Factory Criteria in Miami
 Mixing at Chalice Recording Studios in Los Angeles

Personnel
 Songwriting – Tim Mosley, Nate Hills, Keri Hilson
 Production – Timbaland, Danja
 Recording, mixing and programming – Marcella "Ms. Lago" Araica, Demacio "Demo" Castellon
 Mixing (assistant) – James Barton
 Pro Tools – Ron Taylor
 Drums – Timbaland
 Keyboard and bass – Timbaland, Danja
 Guitar – Kevin Rudolf, Dan Warner, Danja

Charts

Weekly charts

Year-end charts

Release history

References

2007 songs
2008 singles
Interscope Records singles
Keri Hilson songs
Nicole Scherzinger songs
Song recordings produced by Danja (record producer)
Song recordings produced by Timbaland
Songs written by Danja (record producer)
Songs written by Keri Hilson
Songs written by Timbaland
Timbaland songs